The Love Test is a 1935 British romantic comedy film directed by Michael Powell and starring Judy Gunn, Louis Hayward, David Hutcheson, Googie Withers and Thorley Walters.  It was made as a Quota quickie.

Plot
When a woman is made the head of a chemistry laboratory, her colleagues hatch a plot to make her fall in love, and neglect her work duties.

Cast
 Judy Gunn as Mary Lee
 Louis Hayward as John Gregg
 David Hutcheson as Thompson (as Dave Hutcheson)
 Googie Withers as Minnie
 Morris Harvey as Company President
 Aubrey Dexter as Vice-President
 Eve Turner as Kathleen
 Bernard Miles as Allan
 Jack Knight as Managing Director
 Gilbert Davis as Hosiah Smith, Chief Chemist
 Shayle Gardner as Night Watchman
 James Craig as Boiler Man
 Thorley Walters as Chemist
 Ian Wilson as Chemist

Production
The chemistry laboratory is trying to find a way to make the cellulose used to make toy dolls in a non-flammable form. There are obvious resonances to the problem with the highly flammable celluloid used to make films like this one.

Withers made four quota quickies with Powell, who she found a "difficult man",.

Bibliography

 Chibnal, Steve. Quota Quickies : The Birth of the British 'B' Film. London: BFI, 2007. 
 Powell, Michael. A Life in Movies: An Autobiography. London: Heinemann, 1986. .

References

External links
 
 
 
 The Love Test reviews and articles at the Powell & Pressburger Pages

1935 films
1930s English-language films
Films directed by Michael Powell
Films by Powell and Pressburger
1935 romantic comedy films
British romantic comedy films
British black-and-white films
1930s British films